The 2017 Western Michigan Broncos men's soccer team represented Western Michigan University during the 2017 NCAA Division I men's soccer season. It was the 47th season of the university fielding a program. It was the program's fifth season with Chad Wiseman as head coach. The Broncos played their home matches at WMU Soccer Complex.

The 2017 season has been, by far, the most successful season in program history. The program won their first conference regular season title in their 47-year history, and posted the most victories in program history. The Broncos achieved their first ever United Soccer Coaches national ranking since 2003 and climbed into the Top 10 for the first time in their program's history. The team beat three ranked opponents during the season: Butler, Michigan and Akron.

Roster

Coaching staff

Source:

Schedule

|-
!colspan=6 style="background:#6C4023; color:#B5A167;"| Non-conference regular season
|-

|-

|-

|-
!colspan=6 style="background:#6C4023; color:#B5A167;"| MAC regular season
|-

|-
!colspan=6 style="background:#6C4023; color:#B5A167;"| MAC Tournament
|-

|-
!colspan=6 style="background:#6C4023; color:#B5A167;"| NCAA Tournament

|-

Rankings
The following table lists WMU's movement in the 2017 United Soccer Coaches poll, the TopDrawerSoccer.com poll, the Unites Soccer Coaches Great Lake regional poll and the Ratings Percentage Index (RPI) computer ranking.

The TopDrawerSoccer.com poll releases rankings during the NCAA Tournament. WMU was ranked as high as No. 4 following their Second Round victory over Albany.

MLS Draft 
The following members of 2017 Western Michigan Broncos men's soccer team were selected in the 2018 MLS SuperDraft.

References

Western Michigan Broncos men's soccer seasons
Western Michigan Broncos
Western Michigan Broncos
Western Michigan Broncos, soccer
Western Michigan Broncos